South Troy is an unincorporated community in Lincoln County, Missouri, United States.

Notes

Unincorporated communities in Lincoln County, Missouri
Unincorporated communities in Missouri